is a single by Japanese band An Cafe.

The title track is the opening theme in the drama Fuma no Kojirou. The song peaked at No. 19 on the Japanese singles chart.

Track listing
Disc one (CD)
"Ryūsei Rocket" (流星ロケット) – 4:35
"Koi no Dependence" (恋のディペンデンス) – 4:05
"Ryūsei Rocket (Instrumental)" (流星ロケット (Instrumental)) – 4:35
"Koi no Dependence (Instrumental)" (恋のディペンデンス (Instrumental)) – 4:05

Disc two (DVD, Limited edition only)
"Ryūsei Rocket Clip" (流星ロケット)

Personnel
Miku – vocals
Takuya – guitar
Kanon – bass guitar
Yuuki – electronic keyboard
Teruki – drums

References

An Cafe songs
2007 singles
Japanese-language songs
2007 songs
Loop Ash Records singles